is a passenger railway station in located in the city of Higashiōmi,  Shiga Prefecture, Japan, operated by the private railway operator Ohmi Railway.

Lines
Asahi Ōtsuka Station is served by the Ohmi Railway Main Line, and is located 32.8 rail kilometers from the terminus of the line at Maibara Station.

Station layout
The station consists of one side platform serving a single bi-directional track. There is no station building, but only a shelter on the platform itself. The station is unattended.

Platforms

Adjacent stations

History
Asahi Ōtsuka Station was opened on October 16, 1916

Passenger statistics
In fiscal 2019, the station was used by an average of 72 passengers daily (boarding passengers only).

Surroundings
 Myogan-ji
 Hachiman Jinja

See also
List of railway stations in Japan

References

External links

 Ohmi Railway official site 

Railway stations in Japan opened in 1916
Railway stations in Shiga Prefecture
Higashiōmi